The Abolition of Racially Based Land Measures Act, 1991 (Act No. 108 of 1991) is an act of the Parliament of South Africa which repealed many of the apartheid laws that imposed race-based restrictions on land ownership and land use. Among the laws repealed were the Black Land Act, 1913 (formerly the Native Land Act), the Development Trust and Land Act, 1936 (formerly the Native Trust and Land Act) and the Group Areas Act, 1966.

In his speech at the Opening of Parliament on 1 February 1990, State President F. W. de Klerk announced that the Land Acts and the Group Areas Act would be repealed. A white paper on the topic was tabled on 12 March. The bill was passed by Parliament on 5 June, signed by President de Klerk on 27 June, and came into force on 30 June. The reasons that the white minority government repealed what had been its key legislation were to respond to longstanding demands by activists, to build its legitimacy ahead of the negotiations for a transition to democracy and to preempt more radical reforms that the democratic state would potentially bring.

List of repealed principal acts
 Black Land Act, 1913 (Native Land Act, 1913)
 Development Trust and Land Act, 1936 (Native Trust and Land Act, 1936)
 Unbeneficial Occupation of Farms Act, 1937
 Coloured Persons Settlement Act, 1946
 Asiatic Land Tenure Act, 1946
 Black Affairs Act, 1959 (Native Affairs Act, 1959)
 Rural Coloured Areas Act, 1963
 Group Areas Act, 1966
 Black Communities Development Act, 1984

References

External links
 Text of the act

South African legislation
1991 in South African law